RL78 Family is a 16-bit CPU core for embedded microcontrollers of Renesas Electronics introduced in 2010.

Architecture 
Although it has eight 8-bit registers or four 16-bit register pairs, essentially all arithmetic operations are performed on a single accumulator (the A register or AX register pair).  Most models have four register banks which may be selected quickly.

Special-purpose registers consist of:
 20-bit program counter PC
 16-bit stack pointer SP.  This is always 2-byte aligned.
 8-bit program status word PSW.  This includes a carry flag (borrow bit on subtract), auxiliary carry flag and zero flag, but not a negative flag or overflow flag.  The former is unnecessary, as it is possible to branch on the most significant bit of the accumulator directly, but the lack of the latter makes signed comparisons awkward.
 Two 4-bit segment registers, describes below.

Data addressing is mostly 16-bit, with all RAM and special function registers located in the high 64 KB of the address space (0xF0000–0xFFFFF), and data accesses defaulting to that region.  Access to other regions of the address space uses an "ES" prefix opcode, indicating that the high four address bits should come from a special "extra segment" register instead.

The basic 2-operand ALU operations come in the following forms:
 A, #immediate (A ← A op immediate)
 A, register (A ← A op register)
 register, A (register ← register op A)
 A, addr8 (A ← A op [addr8], range limited to special function registers)
 A, addr16 (A ← A op [addr16], ES: prefix optional)
 A, [HL] (A ← A op [HL], ES: prefix optional)
 A, [HL+byte] (A ← A op [HL+byte], ES: prefix optional)
 A, [HL+B] (A ← A op [HL+B], ES: prefix optional)
 A, [HL+C] (A ← A op [HL+C], ES: prefix optional)

Code addresses, in contrast, default to the low portion of the address space where the ROM is located.  Control transfer instructions (jump and call) allow a 20-bit address to be specified, while indirect control transfers use the concatenation of a 16-bit register address and a 4-bit "code segment" register.  Unlike the 8086 microprocessor, there are no separate near and far return instructions; all subroutine calls push the full 20-bit return address.

The architecture is consistently little-endian, with all multi-bytes values appearing least significant byte.

Microarchitectures 
RL78 Family is an accumulator-based register-bank CISC architecture
with 3-stage instruction pipelining. It has 20-bit address space.
Its basic instruction set architecture is succeeded from 78K0R, which has 75 same instructions out of 80.

RL78 has three microarchitecture variants as follows.

Applications 
RL78 covers wide range of application area for mechanical system controls and for user interfaces.

Grouping 
RL78 Family is divided into some groups, those have unique naming rules.
 G1x: For general purpose use
 L1x: For segment LCD controls
 I1x: Mainly for industrial use
 F1x: For automotive use
 D1x: Specially designed for automotive customers only

Application examples 
RL78 is suitable for consumer electronics, such as major appliances (including; washing machines, clothes dryers, dishwashers, refrigerators, and air conditioners), small appliances (including; power tools, vacuum cleaners, and coffeemakers), and medical devices (including; electronic toothbrushes, blood glucose meters, holter monitors). It is also used for factory automation infrastructure (including; sensors, gauges, and actuators),
and energy conservation (including; smart meters, inverter compressors, and lighting control systems).

For automotive industry, low-power and size constrained applications are ideally suited to RL78's automotive dedicated communication interfaces, such as CAN, LIN, and IEBus,
and brushless DC electric motor solutions.

History
RL78 (130nm MF3 flash process) was the first new MCU to emerge from the new Renesas Electronics company from the merger of NEC Electronics and Renesas Technology and incorporated the features of the NEC 78K0R (150nm MF2 flash process) and Renesas Technology R8C microcontrollers. The RL78 core variants include the S1, S2, and S3 type cores which evolved from the NEC 78K0R core.  The basic S1 core support 74 instructions, the S2 core adds register banking and supports 75 instructions, while the S3 core adds an on-chip multiplier / divider / multiple-accumulate and supports 81 instructions.

The RL78 was developed to address extremely low power but highly integrated microcontroller applications, to this end the core offered a novel low power mode of operation called “snooze mode” where the ADC or serial interface can be programmed to meet specific conditions to wake the device from the extreme low power STOP mode of 0.52uA.

Software and development tools
RL78 Family is supported with a various range of hardware and software development tools.

Compilers and IDEs
The GNU Compiler Collection,
Renesas CS+ (formerly CubeSuite+),
Renesas e2studio (based on Eclipse),
and IAR Systems' compiler and development environment
are available.
The Renesas CS+ IDE is free for debug-only use and supports standard ELF executable files. The RL78 ABI defined by Renesas is compatible with IAR's V2 and higher compilers.

Real-time operating systems
Regarding real-time operating systems, CMX Systems, Inc.'s CMX-RTX, Micrium, Inc.'s μC/OS-II and MicroC/OS-III, ITRON OS Segger Microcontroller Systems' embOS, FreeRTOS, and ChibiOS/RT are supported.

Code generating tools
Renesas provides a free code generating tool named APPLIcation LEading Tool (Applilet).

Flash ROM programming libraries
Renesas provides free self-programming libraries; Code Flash Libraries (CFL)
and Data Flash Libraries (DFL).
A EEPROM Emulation Library (EEL) is also available for the data-flash to add wear leveling and robustness. Different classes of DFL and EEL are available to match application needs including the standard T01 type, "Tiny" T02 type, and "Pico" T04 type (DFL-only).

In-circuit emulators
Several companies provide on-chip debuggers and full-spec in-circuit emulators. Renesas makes on-chip debuggers
as well as third-parties, such as Lauterbach and iSystems.
Renesas
and iSystems
supply full-spec in-circuit emulators.

On-chip device programming tools
Device programming can be achieved by using the on-chip debug port or by using the special serial programming mode of the devices. Renesas supports the serial programming mode with debug tools via the Renesas Flash Programmer (RFP)
and the stand-alone programmers; PG-FP5
and PG-FP6,
while several third-parties support RL78 with their own device programmers.

Variants

RL78 Family has a range of devices from 20pin with 16K Byte flash memory to 128pin with 512K Byte flash memory.

RL78/G13
RL78/G13 integrates a +/- 1% accuracy on-chip oscillator, watch dog timer, RTC, power-on reset, low voltage detection, 26 channels of 10bit ADC, 16x16 Multiplier, 32/32 Divider, I2C, CSI/SPI, UART, LIN, multi-function timer array and also built-in IEC 60730 safety support in hardware.
This combination of elements enables the system designer to achieve high performance (41DMIPS) systems operating at very low power levels and at low cost due to the high level of integration in the microcontroller.

RL78/G12
G12 is a smaller version of G13 introduced in 2012. RL78/G12. Introduced with 20, 24, and 30-pin packages with 2 KB to 16 KB small size flash memory although providing the G13 functionality with integrated  +/- 1% 24 MHz oscillator,  reset circuit,  a low voltage detection circuit, watchdog timer, data flash with background operation,  and including functional safety, on-chip with A/D converter testing function.

This small device is designated for use as a sub-microcontroller suitable for use as in small home appliances and general consumer electronic devices.

RL78/G14
In 2012 an addition to the RL78 family was introduced called the G14.
This device offers higher levels of integration with the inclusion of additional multiply and divide and multiply-accumulate instructions capable of faster processing than the RL78/G13, 2 Channel 8-bit D/A, 2 Channel comparator, and timer array making it suitable for motor control applications.
 Multi-function Timer Array Unit (TAU):
 Timer array with encoder function
 Timer array unit (16-bit, 8 ch)
 Interval timer (12 bit, 1 ch)
 Watchdog timer (17-bit, 1 ch)
 Full real time calendar function
 Motor control timer (16-bit, 8 ch)
 Phase timer (16-bit, 2 ch)
 I/O timer (16-bit, 1 ch)

RL78/I1A
An application specific version (ASSP) of the RL78 core was introduced in 2012 for controlling lighting systems, this device was named the RL78/I1A. Specific features of the device such as special PWM timers enable fine dimming, lighting sequence and colour temperature control with power factor correction of the power supply. In addition integrated communication functions for DALI, DMX512 and multiple sensor & user interface controls are provided.
Applications for the RL78/I1A include: building automation, LED drivers, lighting controls, fluorescent ballasts, emergency lighting, HID ballasts, digital power supplies, low-cost inverter controls.

RL78/L12
Microcontroller series with LCD Drive

Entering mass production at the beginning of 2013, the  RL78/L12 includes integrated LCD drive capability for 35 segments x 8 or 39 segments x 4. Three alternative LCD drive methods mat be enabled: split capacitor, capacitive charge pump or external split resistor. With the split capacitor method a low power LCD drive of 0.6uA at 3V can be achieved.  Selectable functions (Seg or I/O) for every segment pin, and drive for both glass and panel.

RL78/F1x
Automotive Microcontrollers

The RL78 F12, F13, F14, & F15 devices replaced the original NEC 78K0R/Fx3 devices with many updates including die shrink, faster core speed (32MHz), improved on-chip debug capability, new peripherals, safety features, and expanded package and memory options.  The application note r01an2639ej can be used as a guide when migrating from 78K0R/Fx3 to RL78/F1x.

See also 
78K
H8 Family
V850
IEBus

References

External links
Technical Information
RL78 family User's Manual: Software  Renesas Electronics
User Guides: IAR Embedded Workbench for Renesas RL78  IAR Systems
Hands-on Review of the Renesas RL78/G13 Demonstration Kit  Digikey Article Library
Bluetooth low energy SDK for Renesas RL78  GitHub  Nordic Semiconductor Playground

Renesas Official Site:
RL78 Family
RL78 Quick Solution

Press Release
November 17, 2010: Renesas Electronics Introduces the New RL78 Microcontroller Family to Deliver Solutions for Next-Generation 8-/16-bit Embedded Applications  Renesas Electronics
March, 2020: Renesas Electronics Introduces the New RL78/G14 Fast Prototyping board Renesas Electronics

Renesas microcontrollers